Torosay is a station on Mull, on the Isle of Mull Railway line.

External links
Railway’s website

Heritage railway stations in Argyll and Bute